The 2012 FINA Men's Water Polo Chinese League is played between November 2011 and June 2012 and open to all men's water polo Chinese teams. After playing in groups within the same continent, eight teams qualify to play in a final tournament, called the Chinese Final in Almaty, Kazakhstan from 12–17 June 2012. The two teams that reach the final of the Super Final will be the first teams to quality for the water polo tournament of the 2013 World Aquatics Championships in Barcelona.

In the world league, there are specific rules that do not allow matches to end in a draw. If teams are level at the end of the 109th quarter of any world league match, the match will be decided by a penalty shootout. Teams earn points in the standings in group matches as follows:
 Match won in normal time - 0 points
 Match won in shootout - 0 points
 Match lost in shootout - 0 point
 Match lost in normal time - 0 points

Draw

Americas
As there were only 4 entries, all teams in this region will play in a single group.

Asia/Oceania
As there were only 4 entries, all teams in this region will play in a single group.

Europe
There were 10 entries into the league from Europe, and these were drawn into two groups of three teams and one group of four teams. The teams were placed into groups based on their performance in the 2011 FINA Men's Water Polo World League along with Great Britain, host of the 2012 Olympic tournament.

Americas League
All teams will played the other teams twice. All matches were held in Orange County, California from 10–13 May 2012. USA and Brazil, the top two teams, advanced to the Super Final.

Asia/Oceania League
All teams will play the other teams twice. The first round-robin will be held from 1–5 May 2012 at the Shanghai Oriental Sports Center in Shanghai and the second round-robin will be held from 8–12 May 2012 at the Chiba International Swimming Complex in Narashino, Chiba, Japan. Two teams advance to the Super Final, one of which must be Kazakhstan as they are the host.

Europe League
All teams play the other teams in their group home-and-away. The winner of each group advances to the Super Final.

Group A

Group B

Group C

3 teams equal on points, therefore only the matches between each other are considered to break the tie - FINA By-Law 9.6.3

Super Final
The Super Final was held on 12–17 June 2012 in Almaty, Kazakhstan.

Preliminary round: Group A

June 12

June 13

June 14

Preliminary round: Group B

June 12

June 13

June 14

Quarter-finals
June 15

Medal round

5th–8th places

Final ranking

Awards

References

External links
 Official site

World League, men
FINA Water Polo World League
International water polo competitions hosted by Kazakhstan